Andreas Bleck is a German politician for the populist party Alternative for Germany (AfD), and since 2017 a member of the Bundestag, the German federal parliament.

Life and achievements
Bleck was born 1988 in the west German town of Neuwied, and attended the University of Koblenz and Landau with the intention of becoming a teacher.

Bleck was a member of the centre-right Christian Democratic Union of Germany (CDU) from 2010 to 2013.

In 2013 he entered the newly founded populist AfD and was member of the advisory council of the party youth organisation, the Young Alternative for Germany.

In 2017 Bleck was elected a member of the Bundestag. 

He is a denier of man-made climate change.

Bleck retained his seat in the 2021 German federal election, and is a member of the 20th Bundestag, which is currently seated.

References

1988 births
People from Neuwied
Living people
Members of the Bundestag for Rhineland-Palatinate
Members of the Bundestag 2021–2025
Members of the Bundestag 2017–2021
Members of the Bundestag for the Alternative for Germany